Paracyrtophyllus robustus, commonly known as the truncated true katydid or central Texas leaf katydid, is a species of true katydid in the family Tettigoniidae. It is found in North America.

References

Pseudophyllinae
Articles created by Qbugbot
Insects described in 1906